CSFC may refer to:

 Connacht Senior Football Championship, a Gaelic football competition in Ireland

In association football:
 Cheltenham Saracens F.C.
 Chemelil Sugar F.C.
 Civil Service F.C.
 Cobham Sports F.C.
 Continental Star F.C.
 Coventry Sphinx F.C.
 Cowes Sports F.C.
 Crane Sports F.C.

In education:
 Cadbury Sixth Form College
 Colchester Sixth Form College
 Coulsdon Sixth Form College